Shabnam is the stage name for Jharna Basak (born 1942), a Bangladeshi–Pakistani stage and film actress.

Shabnam may also refer to:

Films
Shabnam (1949 film), a Hindi film by Bibhuti Mitra
Shabnam (1964 film), a Hindi film starring Mehmood
Shabnam (1993 film), a Hindi film starring Krishan Kumar

People with the name
Shabnam Masood, a character from EastEnders
Shabnam Mausi, Indian politician
Shabnam Nasimi, British Afghani social activist & writer
Shabnam Paryani, contestant in the UK reality competition series  Big Brother 8
Shabnam Shiwan, Fijian designer
Shabnam Surayyo, Tajik singer
Shabnam Tolouei, Iranian actress